Pikeville is a city in Bledsoe County, Tennessee, United States. The population was 2,251 at the 2010 census. It is also the county seat of Bledsoe County.

History
The Sequatchie River valley was part of Cherokee lands until 1805, when the Cherokee ceded it to the U.S. as part of the Treaty of Tellico.  By the late 18th century, the valley had been identified by hunters, one of whom, Anthony Bledsoe (1739-1788), became the county's namesake. Bledsoe County was formed in 1807, with the town of Madison as its county seat.

Pikeville was established in 1816 on lands donated by Charles Love, an early Sequatchie settler. The origin of the town's name is unknown, although some have suggested that it was named for explorer General Zebulon Pike. By 1818, the Bledsoe County seat had been moved from Madison to Pikeville. The town was incorporated in 1830.

J.V. Wigle (1890–1970), a combustion engineer from Michigan and laboratory assistant at Eastern Michigan University, met a local woman, Mattie Lawson, and settled down in Pikeville. He first brought electricity to town when he electrified the house where he lived near the corner of Poplar and Wiegle streets (Wiegle Street, named after J.V. Wigle, is misspelled). In addition to bringing electricity to Pikeville, Wigle bottled Coca-Cola and made wrought iron railings in the community. He was granted two U.S. patents in 1931 (1,798,289 & 1,814,535) for a coin selecting device and a braking mechanism. His two sons attended the engineering school at Vanderbilt University. His son Tom (1933–2006) helped build U.S. Route 127 heading north out of town as it rises up the mountain near the county line, during a summer job between semesters at Vanderbilt. Wigle is buried with his wife in Pikeville City Cemetery in the family plot, along with Tom Wigle.

Geography

Pikeville is located at  (35.607470, -85.191340). The city is situated in the northern half of the Sequatchie Valley, a deep, narrow, and fertile valley that presents as a large rupture in the southern Cumberland Plateau. The walls of the plateau, namely Walden Ridge and Little Mountain, rise prominently to the east and west, respectively. The Sequatchie River passes through the eastern section of Pikeville.

The primary highway running through Pikeville is U.S. Route 127, which connects the city to Crossville atop the plateau to the north and Dunlap to the south. In Pikeville, US-127 splits, with the main route running along Main Street through the city's business district and courthouse square, and a bypass running through a newer commercial area in the western part of the city. State Route 30, which connects Pikeville with Spencer and the Fall Creek Falls State Park area atop the plateau to the west and Dayton across the plateau to the east, runs congruent with US-127 through most of the city.

Climate

Demographics

2020 census

As of the 2020 United States census, there were 1,824 people, 807 households, and 503 families residing in the city.

2019
As of the census of 2019, there were 2,251 people, 792 households, and 488 families residing in the city. The population density was 734.5 people per square mile (284.2/km2). There were 901 housing units at an average density of 354.3 per square mile (137.1/km2). The racial makeup of the city was 94.95% White, 3.09% African American, 0.28% Native American, 0.39% Asian, 0.28% from other races, and 1.01% from two or more races. Hispanic or Latino of any race were 0.84% of the population.

There were 792 households, out of which 29.5% had children under the age of 18 living with them, 46.1% were married couples living together, 14.7% had a female householder with no husband present, and 36.0% were non-families. 34.0% of all households were made up of individuals, and 15.1% had someone living alone who was 65 years of age or older. The average household size was 2.30 and the average family size was 2.94.

In the city, the population was spread out, with 26.3% under the age of 18, 7.0% from 18 to 24, 26.6% from 25 to 44, 22.7% from 45 to 64, and 17.4% who were 65 years of age or older. The median age was 38 years. For every 100 females, there were 87.5 males. For every 100 females age 18 and over, there were 77.8 males.
The median income for a household in the city was $23,438, and the median income for a family was $30,365. Males had a median income of $27,500 versus $19,097 for females. The per capita income for the city was $12,754. About 19.5% of families and 25.2% of the population were below the poverty line, including 29.3% of those under age 18 and 22.3% of those age 65 or over.

Tourism 

 John Bridgeman House- Historical landmark in downtown Pikeville
 Bellview School- Rural schoolhouse built in 1928; now used as a community center
 Bledsoe County Court House
 Lincoln School- A Rosenwald school built in the 1920s
 Pikeville Chapel African Methodist Episcopal Zion Church- Originally a Freedmen's Bureau school built in 1870; converted to AME Zion church in 1888
 Dr. James A. Ross House- Home and office of Dr. James Ross, built c. 1872; now home to the Museum of Bledsoe County History

Notable people

 Josiah M. Anderson, born near Pikeville, United States Congressman
 Ramona Barnes (1938-2003), Alaska state legislator, was born in Pikeville.
 James B. Frazier, Governor of Tennessee (1903–1905) and U.S. Senator
 Theron Hale, Grand Ole Opry fiddler, born in Pikeville in 1883.
 Jeanelle C. Moore, First Lady of North Carolina
 John A. Murrell (1806?-1844), bandit, known for the Mystic Clan or Mystic Confederacy and Murrell Insurrection Conspiracy
 James G. Spears, Civil War general

References

External links

Municipal Technical Advisory Service entry for Pikeville — information on local government, elections, and link to charter

Cities in Tennessee
Cities in Bledsoe County, Tennessee
County seats in Tennessee
Populated places established in 1816